The Roman Catholic Diocese of Dédougou is a diocese located in the city of Dédougou in the Ecclesiastical province of Bobo-Dioulasso in Burkina Faso.

History
 April 14, 2000: Established as Diocese of Dédougou from Diocese of Nouna–Dédougou

Special churches
The cathedral is the Cathédrale Sainte Anne in Dédougou.

Leadership
 Bishops of Dédougou (Roman rite), in reverse chronological order
 Bishop Prosper Bonaventure Ky (April 24, 2018 -)
 Bishop Judes Bicaba (June 4, 2005 - August 19, 2016)
 Bishop Zéphyrin Toé (April 14, 2000 – June 4, 2005)

See also
Roman Catholicism in Burkina Faso

Sources
 GCatholic.org

Dedougou
Christian organizations established in 2000
Roman Catholic dioceses and prelatures established in the 20th century
Dedougou, Roman Catholic Diocese of